Filip Vorotović (Cyrillic: Филип Воротовић, born 8 March 1998) is a Montenegrin footballer who most recently played as a forward for the Serbian SuperLiga side FK Teleoptik.

Club career
In 2014, he joined Partizan. He returned to his hometown club Sutjeska Nikšić the following year. He played with FK Teleoptik in the first half of the 2016–17 Serbian League Belgrade.

On 10 February 2017, he joined Slovenian side Olimpija Ljubljana but failed to make any appearance in the Slovenian PrvaLiga.

In summer 2017 he returned to Serbia and signed with top league side Borac Čačak.

On 14 February 2018, Vorotović officially promoted as a new member of Spartak Subotica, penning three-and-a-half year deal with the club.

References

1998 births
Living people
Footballers from Nikšić
Association football forwards
Montenegrin footballers
Montenegro youth international footballers
FK Sutjeska Nikšić players
FK Igalo 1929 players
FK Teleoptik players
NK Olimpija Ljubljana (2005) players
FK Borac Čačak players
FK Spartak Subotica players
FK Iskra Danilovgrad players
Montenegrin First League players
Serbian SuperLiga players
Serbian First League players
Montenegrin expatriate footballers
Montenegrin expatriate sportspeople in Serbia
Expatriate footballers in Serbia
Montenegrin expatriate sportspeople in Slovenia
Expatriate footballers in Slovenia